Penarth Coast is a Site of Special Scientific Interest in Penarth, Vale of Glamorgan, south Wales.
The coastline nearby at Bendricks Rock contains dinosaur fossils.

See also
List of Sites of Special Scientific Interest in Mid & South Glamorgan

Sites of Special Scientific Interest in the Vale of Glamorgan
Coast of the Vale of Glamorgan